Lily Saxby was a British stage and film actress. She was born in Poplar, London and died in Willesden, London at age 59.

Saxby married Israel Myers a publican in 1906 in Hackney, the marriage ended in divorce in 1917.

Selected filmography
 Traffic (1915)
 Vice and Virtue (1915)
 The Woman Who Did (1915)
 Burnt Wings (1916)
 The Hard Way (1916)

References

External links
 

Year of birth missing
Year of death unknown
English film actresses
English silent film actresses
20th-century English actresses
English stage actresses